Leksell is a surname. Notable people with the surname include:

Alexander Leksell (born 1997), Swedish footballer
Lars Leksell (1907–1986), Swedish neurosurgeon
Laurent Leksell (born 1952), Swedish economist, international business leader and entrepreneur
Victor Leksell (born 1997), Swedish singer